Mamfe is a town in the Akuapim North Municipal District of the Eastern Region of south Ghana. It shares borders with Amanokrom and Akropong

History 
Mamfe is one of the Guan Speaking towns in Akuapem. The rise of the town is dated back to the 15th or 16th century, when the part of the Guans people (the La nation) began to settle in the area.

Festival 
The people of Mamfe celebrate Ohum and this ceremony is usually held in November/December. Ohum is one of Ghana's many festivals that see attendance from people from all walks of life including the diaspora.

References 

Populated places in Ghana